Jack Perez is an American film and television director, screenwriter and film professor. He directed the comedy-thriller Some Guy Who Kills People executive produced by John Landis. He also directed Mega Shark Versus Giant Octopus, whose trailer went viral, and was named by Yahoo! as one of the top 10 trailers of 2009, with more trailer views than Avatar.

He lives in Portland, Oregon.

Filmography

References

External links

Undead Backbrain Interview
Film Courage Video Interviews 
Some Guy Who Kills People Review - Brutal as Hell 
Some Guy Who Kills People comes to DVD - Dread Central 
La Cucaracha Review - Roger Ebert

Year of birth missing (living people)
Living people
American television directors
Film directors from California
American male screenwriters
Screenwriters from California